The Royal Norwegian Navy Museum (Norwegian: Marinemuseet) is a museum documenting the history of the Royal Norwegian Navy. It is located at the former main naval base of Karljohansvern in Horten. The museum was founded by C.F. Klinck on 24 August 1853. The museum is sometimes regarded as the world's first naval museum, as it was the first collection of naval memorabilia open to the public.

The collection
The collection contains several decommissioned ships, much equipment used by the Norwegian, Allied and German navies and ship models, paintings and pictures. In the 1980s the Royal Norwegian Navy Library was transferred to the museum. The library's book collection started in 1805. The Museum and Library have a book collection of about 25,000 volumes. In addition the museum has preserved all of the navy's ship log books from 1814 to today. Parts of the Museum was however destroyed during an allied bombing raid on Horten in February 1945. The museum also preserves ship designs and has an archive of Navy rules and regulations from about 1750 to today, with about 4,500 volumes.

The ships
  — a Sauda class minesweeper still sailing and based in Oslo.
  — a Storm class patrol boat, at 
  (ex USN SC‑718) — a "Shetland bus"  still sailing and based in Bergen.
  — an Oslo class frigate.
  — the world's first torpedo boat.
  — a Tjeld class patrol boat.
  — a Kobben class submarine.

See also
Bamse (St. Bernard) - World War II naval dog honoured at the museum

References

External links
Royal Norwegian Navy Museum web page (Norwegian)
HNSA Web Page: M314 Alta

1853 establishments in Norway
Royal Norwegian Navy
Maritime museums in Norway
Museums in Vestfold og Telemark
Military history of Norway
Naval museums
Museums established in 1853
Military and war museums in Norway